Exclusivity may refer to:

Concepts
Exclusivity (religion), the ubiquitous stance in religion of asserting unique veracity
Mutual exclusivity, if two propositions or events cannot both be true
Exclusive positioning, a marketing strategy

Regulations
Exclusivity (law), rights to exclusivity
Syndication exclusivity, US law giving protection of television station rights
Test data exclusivity, confidentiality of medical data
Console exclusivity, technical system limits to video games

Other uses
"Exclusivity" (song), 1991 R&B song by the duo Damian Dame